Joe Broekhuizen (born July 8, 1991 in Grand Rapids, Michigan) is an American soccer player. Joe played collegiate soccer at Calvin College, and graduated in 2013 soon after signing with the Dutch Lions of the USL Pro. He played for the Lions for two years before playing one year for Vaasan Palloseura of the Veikkausliiga (Finnish premier division). He has a younger brother, Sean Broekhuizen, who also played soccer at Calvin College.

External links
 USL profile

1991 births
Living people
American soccer players
Dayton Dutch Lions players
USL Championship players
Vaasan Palloseura players
Soccer players from Michigan
American expatriate soccer players
Expatriate footballers in Finland
American expatriate sportspeople in Finland
Association football forwards